Amorbia knudsoni is a species of moth of the family Tortricidae. It is found in the United States in western Texas, where it is found at altitudes between 1,700 to 1,900 meters.

The length of the forewings is 12–14.5 mm for males and 14–15 mm for females. The ground color of the forewings is pale yellow. The basal, median and postmedian fascia are light brown. The hindwings are straw yellow. Adults have been recorded on wing from May to August.

Etymology
The species is named in honor of Edward C. Knudson.

References

Moths described in 2007
Sparganothini
Moths of North America